Adebayo Adeleke Lawal is a Nigerian politician who has served as deputy governor of Oyo State since July 2022, he was appointed to the position following the impeachment of Rauf Olaniyan on grounds of misconduct and a series of allegations leveled against him.  

He was Chairman Oyo State Housing Corporation. He graduated from the University of Ibadan with a bachelor's degree in economics. He was appointed as Commissioner of Justice and Attorney General of Oyo State in 1999 by Lam Adesina and served till 2003.

References

Living people

Year of birth missing (living people)
Oyo State politicians
University of Ibadan alumni